Spaceman most commonly refers to:

 Astronaut or cosmonaut, a person trained to operate or serve aboard a spacecraft

Spaceman may also refer to:

Film and television 
 Spaceman (1997 film), an American science fiction comedy film
 Spaceman (2016 film), an American biographical film
 Spaceman (2023 film), an American science fiction drama
 Space-Men, a 1960 Italian science fiction film
 Leo Spaceman, a fictional character on the TV sitcom 30 Rock

Music 
 The Spacemen, a 1959 studio band led by Sammy Benskin

Albums
 Spaceman (Ace Frehley album), 2018
 Spaceman (Nick Jonas album), 2021
 Spaceman (mixtape), by Octavian, 2018
 Spaceman, an EP by Verdena, 2001

Songs
 "Spaceman" (4 Non Blondes song), 1993
 "Spaceman" (Babylon Zoo song), 1996
 "Spaceman" (Bif Naked song), 1998
 "Spaceman" (Hardwell song), 2012
 "Spaceman" (Harry Nilsson song), 1972
 "Spaceman" (The Killers song), 2008
 "Spaceman" (Nick Jonas song), 2021
 "Spaceman", by Dave Matthews Band from Big Whiskey & the GrooGrux King, 2009
 "Spaceman", by Electric Callboy featuring FiNCH from Tekkno, 2022
 "Spaceman", by Journey from Next, 1977
 "Spaceman", by Mumzy Stranger from Journey Begins, 2010
 "Space Man", by Sam Ryder, 2022
 "Space Man", by Smash Mouth from Get the Picture?, 2003
 "Spaceman", by Way Out West, 2008
 "The Spaceman", by Hypnogaja from The Kill Switch, 2003

People with the nickname or stage name 
 Dominic Dale (born 1971), Welsh professional snooker player and commentator
 Ace Frehley (born 1951), American musician and member of the band Kiss
 Bill Lee (left-handed pitcher) (born 1946), American baseball pitcher
 Spaceman Patterson (born 1954), American musical artist
 Jason Pierce (born 1965), English musician and member of the band Spacemen 3

Other uses 
 Spaceman (comics), a comic book miniseries

See also 
 Human spaceflight
 "Mr. Spaceman", a 1966 song by The Byrds
 Man in Space, a Wernher von Braun TV special
 Men in Space, a novel
 Men into Space, TV series
 
 Spacewoman (disambiguation)
 Astronaut (disambiguation)
 Cosmonaut (disambiguation)
 Taikonaut
 Extraterrestrial intelligence
 Solway Firth Spaceman
 Starman (disambiguation)
 Extraterrestrial (disambiguation)
 Alien (disambiguation)
 Space (disambiguation)
 Man (disambiguation)
 Extraterrestrial life in fiction